Mooloo is a rural locality in the Gympie Region, Queensland, Australia. In the  Mooloo had a population of 146 people.

History 
Mooloo Provisional School opened in 1919. In 1922 it became Mooloo State School. It closed on 10 August 1962.

In the  Mooloo had a population of 146 people.

Heritage listings 
Mooloo has the following heritage sites:

 Mooloo Road: Mooloo Hall

References 

Gympie Region
Localities in Queensland